Carnagh railway station was on the Castleblayney, Keady and Armagh Railway in Northern Ireland.

The Castleblayney, Keady and Armagh Railway opened the station on 1 December 1911.

It closed on 2 April 1923.

Routes

References

Disused railway stations in County Armagh
Railway stations opened in 1911
Railway stations closed in 1923
1911 establishments in Ireland
Railway stations in Northern Ireland opened in the 20th century